Last Night You Saw This Band is the fourth album from New Zealand electronic band Minuit, which was released on 21 December 2012 by Dollhouse Records.

Track listing 
 "Last Night You Saw This Band"
 "Book Of The Dead"
 "Islands"
 "What We Know"
 "Good Ol' Days"
 "The Love That Won't Shut Up"
 "Ghost"
 "Stories for Boys"
 "Heaven"
 "Warheads"
 "Sisters on the Balcony"
 "Sit Down Beside Me"

References

External links 
 Last Night You Saw This Band at BandCamp
 Official Site

Minuit (band) albums
2012 albums